The Women's Basketball Tournament at the 2014 Lusophony Games was the 3rd Lusophony Games basketball tournament, played under the rules of FIBA, the world governing body for basketball. The tournament was hosted by India from 23 to 27 January 2014.

Mozambique ended the round-robin tournament with a 3–0 unbeaten record to win their second title.

Participating teams

Squads

Schedule 

Times are local (UTC+05:30).

Day 1

Day 2

Day 3

Final standings

Awards

References

External links
Official Website

Women's tournament
2014 in women's basketball
International women's basketball competitions hosted by India
Women's basketball competitions between national teams
Bask